Kavala Almond Cookies, Kavala Cookies or Edirne Almond Cookies is a kurabiye from Turkish cuisine. The Kavala cookie is made with almond, flour and butter. The kurabiye gets its name from Kavala. The modern recipe of the cookie originated during the Ottoman Empire.

See also 
 Kurabiye
 Kourabiedes

References 

Ottoman cuisine
Turkish cuisine
Almond cookies